Year 1084 (MLXXXIV) was a leap year starting on Monday (link will display the full calendar) of the Julian calendar.

Events 
 By place 

 Europe 
 March 31 – Emperor Henry IV besieges Rome and enters the city. He is crowned emperor by Antipope Clement III at Rome and receives the patrician authority.
 May – Sack of Rome: Duke Robert Guiscard leads a Norman army (36,000 men) north and enters Rome; the city is sacked, and Henry IV is forced to retreat.
 Robert Guiscard returns with 150 warships in Illyria (modern Albania), and occupies Corfu and Kefalonia with the support of Ragusa and the Dalmatian city-states.
 King Halsten Stenkilsson is killed and his brother Inge the Elder is deposed in Svealand (modern Sweden). Inge is replaced by his brother-in-law Blot-Sweyn.

 Seljuk Empire 
 The Seljuk Turks under Sultan Malik-Shah I conquer Byzantine Antioch, held by Philaretos Brachamios, an Armenian general, who seize power as a usurper.

 Asia 
 Sima Guang, Chinese chancellor and historian, with a group of scholars, completes the Zizhi Tongjian, a chronicle of the universal history of China.
 April 21 – King Kyansittha begins his reign as ruler of the Pagan Kingdom in Burma (modern Myanmar).

 By topic 

 Religion 
 Pope Gregory VII, who is imprisoned by Henry IV in Castel Sant'Angelo, is freed by Robert Guiscard. He restores papal authority in Rome.
 Bruno of Cologne founds the Carthusian Order which includes both monks and nuns. He builds an hermitage in the French Alps.
 Building work starts on Worcester Cathedral. Orchestrated by Bishop Wulfstan.

Births 
 August 1 – Heonjong, Korean king of Goryeo (d. 1097)
 Alan I (le Noir), viscount of Rohan (d. 1147)
 Ali ibn Yusuf, ruler of the Almoravids (d. 1143)
 Bahram-Shah, ruler of the Ghaznavids (d. 1157)
 Charles I (the Good), count of Flanders (d. 1127) 
 David I, king of Scotland (approximate date)
 Li Qingzhao, Chinese female poet and writer
 Rainier, margrave of Montferrat (approximate date)
 Rechungpa, Tibetan founder of the Kagyu school (d. 1161)
 Wang, Chinese empress of the Song Dynasty (d. 1108)

Deaths 
 February 16 – Siegfried I, archbishop of Mainz
 June 28 – Ekkehard of Huysburg, German abbot
 October 10 – Gilla Pátraic, bishop of Dublin
 November 20 – Otto II, margrave of Montferrat
 Aghsartan I, Georgian king of Kakheti and Hereti 
 Fujiwara no Kenshi, Japanese empress (b. 1057)
 Halsten Stenkilsson, king of Sweden (approximate date)
 Herfast (or Arfast), Norman Lord Chancellor
 Hoël II, duke of Brittany (House of Cornouaille)
 Saw Lu, king of the Pagan Kingdom (b. 1049)

References